Obersee ("upper lake") or Oberer Arosasee is the lake in the center of Arosa, a resort in the Grisons, Switzerland. Arosa's lower lake (Untersee) is at 1691 m.

Gallery

See also
List of mountain lakes of Switzerland

External links

Lakes of Switzerland
Lakes of Graubünden
Arosa
LObersee